The 135th district of the Texas House of Representatives contains parts of north-central Houston. The current Representative is Jon Rosenthal, who was first elected in 2018 after defeating a 12-term incumbent.

References 

135